Marc Laforge (born January 3, 1968, in Sudbury, Ontario) is a former professional ice hockey defenceman. He was drafted in the second round, 32nd overall, by the Hartford Whalers in the 1986 NHL Entry Draft. He played nine games with the Whalers in the 1989–90 season before they traded him to the Edmonton Oilers in exchange for Cam Brauer on March 6, 1990. He would eventually play five games with the Oilers during the 1993–94 season.

After playing three seasons in the Ontario Hockey League with the Kingston Canadians, the enforcer Laforge joined the Sudbury Wolves for the 1987–88 OHL season. Fourteen games into the season, Laforge was involved a postgame brawl with the Guelph Platers. Laforge attacked eight different Platers while they were involved in other fights, and he was also accused of driving Plater goaltender Andy Helmuth's head into the ice. Laforge was given a two-year suspension from the league (the equivalent of a lifetime ban for a 19-year-old in a league with an age limit of 21) for his actions, ending his career as a junior player. Laforge later referred to the incident as "the dumbest thing I've ever done."

Laforge amassed over 3,000 penalty minutes in his professional hockey career. As a junior player, he set the Kingston Canadians all-time record for career penalty minutes with 686. In his fourteen-game NHL career, he scored no points and spent 64 minutes in the penalty box. In addition, he holds the Manitoba Moose record for penalty minutes in a single period, tallying 37 in the first period of a 1997 game against the Long Beach Ice Dogs.

Career statistics

References

External links

1968 births
Living people
Anchorage Aces players
Bakersfield Condors (1998–2015) players
Binghamton Whalers players
Canadian ice hockey defencemen
Cape Breton Oilers players
Edmonton Oilers players
Hartford Whalers draft picks
Hartford Whalers players
Ice hockey people from Ontario
Sportspeople from Greater Sudbury
Indianapolis Ice players
Indianapolis Ice (CHL) players
Kingston Canadians players
Manitoba Moose (IHL) players
Minnesota Moose players
Salt Lake Golden Eagles (IHL) players
San Antonio Dragons players
San Antonio Iguanas players
San Diego Gulls (WCHL) players
Sudbury Wolves players
Syracuse Crunch players
Canadian expatriate ice hockey players in the United States